Namonuito may be,

Namonuito Atoll
Namonuito language